Reginald Neal may refer to:

 Reginald Neal (footballer) (1914–?), English footballer
 Reginald Neal (cricketer) (1901–1964), English cricketer
 Reginald H. Neal (1909–1992), American painter and printmaker